The 2018 Malaysia Cup Final was a football match which were played on 27 October 2018, to determine the champion of the 2018 Malaysia Cup. It was the final of the 92nd edition of the Malaysia Cup, competition organised by the Football Association of Malaysia.

It was played at the Shah Alam Stadium, in Shah Alam, Selangor, between Terengganu FC and Perak.

Road to final

Note: In all results below, the score of the finalist is given first.

Match details

Statistics

See also
2018 Malaysia FA Cup Final

References

External links
FAM Official website

Malaysia Cup seasons
2018 in Malaysian football